Owen Pickering (born January 27, 2004) is a Canadian junior ice hockey defenceman currently playing for the Swift Current Broncos of the Western Hockey League (WHL) as a prospect to the Pittsburgh Penguins of the National Hockey League (NHL). Pickering was drafted twenty-first overall by the Penguins in the 2022 NHL Entry Draft.

On July 16, 2022, Pickering was signed to a three-year, entry-level contract with the Pittsburgh Penguins.

Career statistics

Regular season and playoffs

International

References

External links

2004 births
Living people
Ice hockey people from Manitoba
National Hockey League first-round draft picks
People from Winnipeg Capital Region
Pittsburgh Penguins draft picks
Swift Current Broncos players